Lieutenant Lawrence Kingsley Callahan was a World War I flying ace credited with five victories.

Early life
Callahan was born in Louisville, Kentucky and graduated from Cornell University.

World War I aerial service
He was living in Chicago when he initially joined the Aviation Section, U.S. Signal Corps. He served on exchange duty with the Royal Flying Corps, receiving advanced training as a fighter pilot and attached to 85 Squadron when it went to war on the Western Front. He flew Royal Aircraft Factory SE.5a fighters to his first three triumphs, on 16 June, 13 July, and 24 July 1918. He then switched to No. 148 Squadron and its Sopwith Camels for his last two victories, when he destroyed Fokker D.VII fighters on 3 and 28 October 1918.

Elliott White Springs's Warbirds memoirs of No. 85 Squadron featured Callahan.

Post World War I
Callahan returned to the military for World War II, joining the U.S. Army Air Corps. This term of service took him to duty with the 12th U.S. Air Force in Oran, Algeria.

Honors and awards
Distinguished Flying Cross (DFC)

For gallantry and skill. On 28 October 1918, this officer, whilst leading his flight, attacked a formation of seven Fokkers and after firing a short burst at one EA, sent it down completely out of control NW of Jenlain, and drove another EA off the tail of one of his flight. His flight in this fight accounted for six EA crashed and one out of control without losing a machine, a result largely due to his skilful leading. On another occasion he engaged a formation of EA over Esnes and succeeded in shooting down several of the EA which crashed near Esnes. This officer has accounted for seventeen EA crashed and one driven down out of control; he has proven himself an exceptionally fine patrol leader and has at all times displayed gallantry, initiative and devotion to duty of the highest order.

See also

 List of World War I flying aces from the United States

References

Bibliography
Above the Trenches: A Complete Record of the Fighter Aces and Units of the British Empire Air Forces 1915-1920 Christopher F. Shores, Norman L. R. Franks, Russell Guest. Grub Street, 1990. , .
 American Aces of World War I. Norman Franks, Harry Dempsey. Osprey Publishing, 2001. , .

External links

United States Army Air Service pilots of World War I
American World War I flying aces
Cornell University alumni
Military personnel from Louisville, Kentucky
1894 births
1977 deaths
Recipients of the Distinguished Flying Cross (United Kingdom)